The Time Is Right may refer to:
 The Time Is Right (Lou Donaldson album)
 The Time Is Right (Woody Shaw album)